Charles Atkins may refer to:
Charles Atkins (American politician) (1831–1898), American politician
 Charles Atkins (Australian politician) (1885–1960), Australian politician
 Charles Atkins was a 15-year-old boy lynched on May 18, 1922
 Speedy Atkins (Charles Henry Atkins, 1875–1928), American tobacco worker displayed as a mummy
 Cholly Atkins (Charles Atkins, 1913–2003), American dancer and vaudeville performer